The 1930 Northern League was the second season of speedway in the United Kingdom for Northern British teams. The league was previously known as the English Dirt Track League but the addition of two Scottish teams prompted a name change and 1930 was the inaugural Northern League. The Southern teams also had their second season known as the 1930 Speedway Southern League. The league was won by Belle Vue Aces.

Summary
There were many team changes from the previous season. Reigning champions Leeds Lions, Halifax, Salford and Middlesbrough dropped out. Manchester White City, Belle Vue and Warrington renewed their participation having withdrawn partway through the previous season. Edinburgh, Glasgow White City and Wombwell were new entrants. Barnsley, Manchester White City withdrew during the season but their records were not expunged.

Eddie Reynolds was killed during the Glasgow Handicap match at the White City Stadium, Glasgow on 27 May 1930. After falling from his bike he was hit by Arthur Moser and suffered fatal injuries.

Final table

Top Five Riders

See also
List of United Kingdom Speedway League Champions

References

Speedway Northern League
1930 in British motorsport
1930 in speedway